Jolanta Majka née Jolanta Pawlak (born 13 July 1978) is a Polish adaptive rower and former Paralympic swimmer who competes at international level events. She is six-time World medalist and European silver medalist in rowing.

Majka has competed at four Paralympic Games in two different sports: swimming at the 2000 Summer Paralympics and rowing from 2008 Summer Paralympics to 2016 Summer Paralympics.

References

External links

1978 births
Living people
Rowers from Warsaw
Paralympic rowers of Poland
Paralympic swimmers of Poland
Swimmers at the 2000 Summer Paralympics
Rowers at the 2008 Summer Paralympics
Rowers at the 2012 Summer Paralympics
Rowers at the 2016 Summer Paralympics
S10-classified Paralympic swimmers
21st-century Polish people